Elections to the French National Assembly were held in the constituency of Senegal-Mauritania on 2 June 1946 as part of the wider parliamentary elections. Two members were elected from the seat, with the winners being French Section of the Workers International candidates Lamine Guèye and Léopold Sédar Senghor. Both were incumbent MPs, having won their seats in the 1945 elections.

Results

First college

Second college

References

1946 in Mauritania
1946 in Senegal
1946 I
1946 I
1946 elections in France
Mauritania
June 1946 events in Africa